The following is a list of notable musicians who compose or have composed Celtic fusion music.

A

Afro Celt Sound System

B

Bad Haggis featuring Eric Rigler
Baka Beyond 
Bodega
Bongshang
Beltaine's Fire
Martyn Bennett
Blaggards

C
Capercaillie
Carbon Leaf
Ceredwen
Clannad
The Corrs
Croft No. 5
The Crossing
Cruachan

D
The Dreaming
Dropkick Murphys

E
Enter the Haggis
Enya

F
Figgy Duff
Flogging Molly
Finn MacCool

G
Gaelic Storm
The Gloaming
Glengarry Bhoys
Great Big Sea

I
The Iron Horse

K
Kíla
Sharon Knight

L
La Bottine Souriante
Leahy
Nolwenn Leroy
The Levellers
Lucid Druid
Lúnasa

M
Manau
Mark Saul
Marxman
Alyth McCormack
Michael McGoldrick
Mill a h-Uile Rud
Loreena McKennitt
Ashley MacIsaac
Natalie MacMaster
Moondragon
Mouth Music
Mudmen

N
Neck

O
Ockham's Razor
Old Blind Dogs

P
Paul Mounsey
Peatbog Faeries
Pipedown
The Pogues
Primordial

R
Rare Air
The Real Mckenzies
Rock Salt & Nails
Ron Korb
Roving Crows
Runrig

S
Salsa Celtica
Mark Saul
Seelyhoo
Seven Nations
Shooglenifty
Skelpin
Skyedance
Slainte Mhath
Spirit of the West
Gary Stadler
Alan Stivell

U
Uisce Beatha

W
Wolfstone

See also
Celtic music
Celtic fusion